In France, under the Ancien Régime, the officer of state responsible for the judiciary was the Chancellor of France. The Chancellor was responsible for seeing that royal decrees were enrolled and registered by the sundry parlements, provincial appellate courts. However, since the Chancellor was appointed for life, and might fall from favour, or be too ill to carry out his duties, his duties would occasionally fall to his deputy, the Keeper of the Seals of France.

The last Chancellor died in 1790, by which time the French Revolution was well underway, and the position was left vacant. Instead, in 1791, the Chancellor's portfolio and responsibilities were assigned to the Keeper of the Seals who was accordingly given the additional title of Minister of Justice under the Revolutionary government. After the Bourbon Restoration in 1814, the position of the Chancellor was divorced from its judicial responsibilities and re-established as president of the Chamber of Peers, the upper house of the French parliament until 1848. The last Chancellor was Etienne-Denis Pasquier, appointed by King Louis Philippe I in 1837.

Frankish chancellors under the Merovingians and Carolingians 
 496–533: Rémi de Reims, known as Saint Rémi (Référendaire of France)
 561: Siggo, référendaire to Sigebert I, then to Chilperic I and to Childebert II
 618–638: Romain de Rouen, known as Saint Romain, bishop of Rouen
 638–657: Dadon, known as Saint Ouen, grand référendaire to Dagobert I and also to Clovis II
 657–695: Ansbert, bishop of Rouen, référendaire
 695–710: Saint Bonit, bishop of Auvergne, référendaire to Sigebert III, king of Austrasia
 652–673: Robert II, référendaire to Clotaire III
 750–768: Fulard, Abbot of St. Denis, chancellor to Pepin the Short
 796–800: Alcuin, Abbot of Tours, chancellor to Charlemagne as king of the Franks, prepared the Capitulaire De Villis
 800–819: Fridgise, chancellor to Charlemagne, then to Louis the Pious
 819–832: Adalard, chancellor to Louis the Pious
See also Royal Administration of Merovingian and Carolingian Dynasties.

Chancellors of France

Keepers of the Seals, 1699–1790

See also 
 Royal household under the Merovingians and Carolingians

Notes 

Justice
Judiciary of France